The Solnan is a  long river in the Ain and Saône-et-Loire departments in eastern France. Its source is at Verjon, in the Jura Mountains. It flows generally north-northwest. It is a left tributary of the Seille into which it flows at Louhans.

Its main tributaries are the Sevron and the Vallière.

Departments and communes along its course
This list is ordered from source to mouth: 
 Ain: Verjon, Villemotier, Bény, Salavre, Coligny, Pirajoux, Domsure, Beaupont, 
 Saône-et-Loire: Condal, Dommartin-lès-Cuiseaux, Varennes-Saint-Sauveur, Frontenaud, Sainte-Croix, Bruailles, La Chapelle-Naude, Louhans,

References

Rivers of France
Rivers of Auvergne-Rhône-Alpes
Rivers of Bourgogne-Franche-Comté
Rivers of Ain
Rivers of Saône-et-Loire